Pinfield is a surname. Notable people with the surname include:

 Matt Pinfield (born 1961), American TV host, disc jockey and music executive
 Mervyn Pinfield (1912–1966), British TV producer and director
 Reginald Pinfield (1894–1972), English cricketer

See also
 Penfield (disambiguation)